Servants of the Holy Family (S.S.F. from Latin: Servi Sanctae Familiae) is a semi-contemplative, traditional Catholic religious community of men located in Colorado Springs, Colorado (USA). Membership includes priests, seminarians and brothers. Servants of the Holy Family (SHF) was the first traditional Latin Mass religious community for men begun in the United States. The introduction of the Mass of Paul VI was a catalyst for such foundations in the Church. SHF's website states that it is faithful to the traditional Latin Mass and Catholic doctrine and morals and is endorsed by Catholic Bishops worldwide who support the traditional Latin Mass.

Foundation and Purpose
SHF was founded in 1977 on the feast of the Holy Family and was placed under the patronage of Jesus, Mary, and Joseph. The community has been located in Colorado since February 1977. The motherhouse with its chapel is situated on ten acres of land south of the Black Forest near the city of Colorado Springs, Colorado.

Their stated purpose is "to aspire after and achieve by the grace of God the sanctification of its members and the salvation of souls through their prayers, sacrifices and apostolate". It intends to accomplish this chiefly by attachment to the Holy Sacrifice of the traditional Latin Mass and to the Roman Breviary. Other important devotions observed by all the members are Benediction of the Blessed Sacrament, the frequent reception of the sacrament of Penance, keeping days of recollection on a regular basis, and praying the Holy Rosary with one of the approved litanies daily. Also, frequent visits to the Blessed Sacrament as well as mental prayer and spiritual reading are considered most important for all of the members, who are to regard holiness of life as their primary objective. According to their website, their apostolate is the salvation of souls through the Mass, the Catholic Liturgy, the dispensing of the Sacraments, traditional Catholic sermons, morality, the spiritual life, and teaching of the Baltimore catechism. They allow the public to attend many of their liturgical ceremonies.

Apostolic Works
According to their website, the liturgical life of Servants of the Holy Family is based on the traditional Latin Mass, which is offered exclusively at the SHF chapel. SHF also offers Masses and Gregorian Masses, using the traditional Latin Mass, for the faithful who request them.

For the perpetuating of the Holy Sacrifice of the Mass and for serving at the Holy Altar, SHF has, since its inception, prepared men for the priesthood. The traditional program combines the minor seminary and major seminary curriculum and encompasses high school courses, philosophy and theology.

The imparting of traditional Catholic doctrine and morals is accomplished mainly through sermons. SHF has a sermon program which began in the 1970s. Recordings of sermons were first distributed using cassette tapes and then compact discs, but are now available on their website.

To further assist in explaining the truths of the Church, SHF has been active in catechetical work using the Internet to reach people domestically and internationally. SHF popularized the use of the Fr. Connell edition of the Baltimore Catechism #3 and created the Kindle version of it. They have produced an online series of talks about the Catholic Faith which is based on the Baltimore Catechism.

SHF publishes a Liturgical Calendar which gives the accurate daily schedule of the Church’s worship throughout the year and includes devotional art and a mini-catechism section with prayers.

SHF recorded a compact disc of inspirational Gregorian chant and polyphonic music intended to enhance appreciation of the Sacred Liturgy in the Church.

History
Besides its internal life as a religious community and its apostolic work, SHF has been involved with other Church issues.

In 1983, SHF was contacted by Archbishop Marcel Lefebvre, superior of the Society of Saint Pius X (SSPX), and Father Clarence Kelly, who had recently been separated from the SSPX with eight other priests. Lefebvre was seeking help because of this division and other internal problems in the SSPX. Kelly was looking for mediation between his group and the SSPX. SHF assisted both during these negotiations.

Starting In 1989, Augustin Cardinal Mayer, first president of the Pontifical Commission Ecclesia Dei, worked with SHF on its use of the traditional Latin Mass and appointed then-Archbishop (later Cardinal) J. Francis Stafford as mediator between SHF and the local bishop.

SHF received new priest members when its seminarians were ordained by a visiting Catholic bishop in 1995. In the following years, other visiting Catholic bishops confirmed people who attended Mass at the SHF chapel.

In 2004, Michael John Sheridan, former Bishop of Colorado Springs, mailed a letter critical of SHF to each family attending Mass there. Fr. Allan Kucera from SHF responded to the local newspaper simply that, "If anyone is interested, he or she may come and see for themselves what we are about."

Later in 2013, another visiting Catholic bishop confirmed at the SHF chapel, and in 2018 yet another bishop gave tonsure and full minor orders, and in 2020 yet another bishop performed confirmations and ordination to the Holy Priesthood.

Notes and references

External links
Servants of the Holy Family—official website

Catholic orders and societies
Traditionalist Catholic priests
Communities using the Tridentine Mass